Ineffective erythropoiesis is active erythropoiesis with premature death of red blood cells, a decreased output of RBCs from the bone marrow, and, consequently, anemia.
It is a condition characterised by the presence or abundance of dysfunctional progenitor cells.

See also
 Congenital dyserythropoietic anemias
 List of hematologic conditions

References

Medical terminology
Anemias